Waurn Ponds railway station is located on the Warrnambool line in Victoria, Australia. It serves the southern Geelong suburb of Waurn Ponds, and it opened on 12 October 2014.

History

Waurn Ponds serves as the terminus for V/Line's Geelong line services. Located between Oakwood Crescent and Rossack Drive, the station was initially to be named Grovedale, but was renamed Waurn Ponds before opening.

In April 2013, the Victorian Government announced that a new station would be built at Waurn Ponds, to serve the nearby suburbs of Grovedale and Armstrong Creek. The station was budgeted at $25.9 million; $9.4 million for planning and land acquisition, and $16.5 million to build a single platform with passenger amenities, booking office and toilets, road and bus bays, bicycle storage and parking for 200 cars.

Contracts for the construction of the station were awarded in February 2014. In July 2014, the name of the station was changed to Waurn Ponds, and the size of the planned car park was increased to 292 spaces, along with overflow parking for a further 100 to 150 vehicles. The new station opened on 12 October 2014.

In 2020, the State Government announced an upgrade to the station, as part of the Regional Rail Revival project. The project included the construction of a new platform to the south of the existing platform, a new pedestrian overpass, an upgraded car park and upgraded lighting and CCTV. As part of these works, the railway line between Waurn Ponds and South Geelong is also to be duplicated, as well as the construction of a new maintenance and stabling facility. Major works at the station were completed in January 2022, with all station upgrades, including the second platform, in use by 31 May of that year.

The Waurn Ponds name is also used by V/Line's Network Access Division, to refer to the Victorian Portland Cement Company sidings at the Blue Circle Southern Cement plant, two kilometres west of the passenger station. On 31 May 2021, the sidings were officially abolished.

Platforms and services

Waurn Ponds has two side platforms. It is serviced by V/Line Geelong and Warrnambool line services.

Platform 1:
  services to Southern Cross
  services to Warrnambool and Southern Cross

Platform 2:
  services to Southern Cross
  services to Warrnambool and Southern Cross

Transport links

McHarry's Buslines operates three routes via Waurn Ponds station, under contract to Public Transport Victoria:
 : Geelong station – Deakin University Waurn Ponds Campus
 : Geelong station – Deakin University Waurn Ponds Campus
 : Armstrong Creek – Waurn Ponds Shopping Centre

Gallery

References

External links
Services from Waurn Ponds - Public Transport Victoria
Waurn Ponds Station upgrade - Regional Rail Revival

Railway stations in Geelong
Railway stations in Australia opened in 2014
Regional railway stations in Victoria (Australia)